Khadakwasla  Assembly constituency is one of the 288 Vidhan Sabha (legislative assembly) constituencies of Maharashtra state, western India. This constituency is located in Pune district.

Geographical scope
The constituency comprises as follows:
 Haveli taluka 
 Khed Shivapur revenue circle excluding areas under Pune Municipal Corporation (PMC).
 Ward no. 143 of PMC (Narhe village)
 Ward no. 146 of PMC (Nanded village)
 Ward no. 147 of PMC (Kirkatwadi village)
 Ward no. 148 of PMC (Khadakwasla village)
 Kothrud revenue circle excluding areas under (PMC).
 Ward no. 152 of PMC (Shivne village)
 Ward no. 153 of PMC (Uttamnagar village)
 Ward no. 154 of PMC (Kopre village)
 Ward no. 155 of PMC (Kondhwe Dhavde village)
 PMC
Ward nos. 31, 140, 144, 145, 149, 151,156, 158.

Members of Legislative Assembly

Election Result

2019

References

Assembly constituencies of Pune district
Assembly constituencies of Maharashtra